Unison World School is an all girls' residential school in Dehradun, Uttarakhand, India. The school teaches from grades VI to XII. Unison World School has tied up with Kilgraston School (UK), Rangi Ruru Girls School (New Zealand), and St. Francis' College, UK for International Exchange Programmes. The school offers ICSE, ISC and IGCSE, A/AS Level programmes.It is known for its wide range of co-curricular activities and firm educational structure. School ranks among the top All Girls Residential schools in India.

See also
 Ashok Hall Girls' Residential School
 Mussoorie International School

References

External links

International schools in India
Boarding schools in Uttarakhand
Girls' schools in Uttarakhand
High schools and secondary schools in Uttarakhand
Schools in Dehradun
Educational institutions in India with year of establishment missing